Latham is an unincorporated community in Lane County, Oregon, United States. It is located on Interstate 5 about 2 miles south of downtown Cottage Grove. The community was named after the politician Milton S. Latham. The post office operated for about ten years, from September 16, 1878 to February 14, 1888. James J. Comstock was its first postmaster. Latham is now served by the Cottage Grove post office.

References

Unincorporated communities in Lane County, Oregon
1878 establishments in Oregon
Populated places established in 1878
Unincorporated communities in Oregon